Ebonshire - Volume 1 is the 20th album released by Nox Arcana. It is the first in a series of winter holiday EPs inspired by Nox Arcana's holiday music trilogy: Winter's Knight (2005), Winter's Eve (2009), and Winter's Majesty (2012), which are each set in a fantasy realm called Ebonshire.

Composer Joseph Vargo explained that each year a new volume of songs is to be added to the Ebonshire series for the winter holiday season.

Track listing
 Shades of the Past — 2:39
 Homeward Bound — 2:56
 Kindred Spirits — 2:44

References

External links 
 Nox Arcana's official website
[ Ebonshire] at Allmusic

Nox Arcana albums
2013 EPs
2013 Christmas albums
Christmas EPs
Christmas albums by American artists
New-age Christmas albums